Scott Charles Hendrix (April 3, 1883 – August 21, 1982), nicknamed "Iron Man", was an American Negro league pitcher in the 1910s.

A native of Sherburne, Kentucky, Hendrix played for the Lincoln Giants in 1918. In six recorded games on the mound, he posted a 4.67 ERA over 52 innings. Hendrix died in Chicago, Illinois in 1982 at age 99.

References

External links
Baseball statistics and player information from Baseball-Reference Black Baseball Stats and Seamheads

1883 births
1982 deaths
Lincoln Giants players
Baseball pitchers
Baseball players from Kentucky
People from Fleming County, Kentucky
20th-century African-American people